Gnathichnus is a trace fossil on a hard substrate (typically a shell, rock or hardground made of calcium carbonate) formed by regular echinoids as they scraped the surface with their five-toothed Aristotle's Lantern feeding structures (Bromley, 1975).

References
 

Trace fossils